Temecula Preparatory School is a tuition-free, K-12, public charter school located in French Valley, California, just north of Temecula. The school is sponsored by the Temecula Valley Unified School District and was formerly managed and operated by Heritage Classical Charter Schools of America. It follows the principles of Classical Education, with an emphasis on the four platonic virtues from antiquity: Justice, Prudence, Fortitude, and Temperance. TPS athletic teams have won several league championships. TPS curriculum has an emphasis on the arts and provides instruction in theater, art and music.

References

Sources
 
 
 

High schools in Riverside County, California
Public high schools in California
2000 establishments in California